Kapurthala Cantonment is a cantonment in the Punjab state of India. It is adjacent to the town of Kapurthala. In addition to having residence and offices of military personnel, the Kendriya Vidyalaya school (Central School) is situated at the Kapurthala Cantonment.

Cities and towns in Kapurthala district
Cantonments of British India
Cantonments of India